The Fubon Senior Open was a men's golf tournament on the European Senior Tour. The tournament was held from 2011 to 2013 at Miramar Golf Country Club, north-west of New Taipei City, Taiwan. The event was co-sanctioned with the Senior PGA of Taiwan. In 2013 the prize fund was $450,000.

Winners

External links
Coverage on the European Senior Tour's official site

Former European Senior Tour events
Golf tournaments in Taiwan
Recurring sporting events established in 2011
Recurring sporting events disestablished in 2013
2011 establishments in Taiwan
2013 disestablishments in Taiwan